Bengaluru Underworld is a 2017 Indian Kannada crime drama film directed by P. N. Sathya. It stars Aditya in the lead role. Paayal Radhakrishna and  Daniel Balaji feature in supporting roles.

Plot

Ram/Maalik (Aditya),  an underworld don wants to be the king in Bangalore. But some people in the other gang don't want that to happen. He fights back till he gets the position. How he got the grip in the area with everyone seeming and supporting him in whatever he does is the entire story.

Cast

Aditya as Ram/Maalik
Paayal Radhakrishna as Sirisha
Daniel Balaji as ACP Thomas

Soundtrack

Anoop Seelin composed music for the film's soundtrack. The album consists of two soundtracks.

References

External links
 

Indian gangster films
Films set in Bangalore
2010s Kannada-language films
Indian crime drama films
Films directed by P. N. Sathya
Films scored by Anoop Seelin